The Optare StarRider was a minibus and minicoach body manufactured by Optare between 1987 and 1994. It was fitted to the Mercedes-Benz 811D chassis, with its body made from a steel frame with aluminium alloy and GPR exterior panels. 

It was launched in August 1987. A total of 240 were built, with Badgerline, London Regional Transport and Yorkshire Traction major customers. It was succeeded by the Optare MetroRider in 1994.

References

External links

StarRider
Vehicles introduced in 1987
Minibuses
Coaches (bus)